Martin David Partridge (born 25 October 1954) is a former English cricketer. He played for Gloucestershire between 1976 and 1980.

References

External links

1954 births
Living people
English cricketers
Gloucestershire cricketers
People from Cotswold District
Sportspeople from Gloucestershire